Jayden Lennox (born 14 December 1994) is a New Zealand cricketer. He made his List A debut on 17 November 2019, for Central Districts in the 2019–20 Ford Trophy. He made his Twenty20 debut on 4 January 2021, for Central Districts in the 2020–21 Super Smash. He made his first-class debut on 19 March 2021, for Central Districts in the 2020–21 Plunket Shield season.

References

External links
 

1994 births
Living people
New Zealand cricketers
Central Districts cricketers
Place of birth missing (living people)